St. Mary's Episcopal Church, also known as the Church of St. Mary the Virgin, is an historic rectangular-shaped Carpenter Gothic style Episcopal church located at 5610 Dogwood Road in Woodlawn, Baltimore County, Maryland. Designed by the Baltimore architectural firm of Dixon and Carson, it was built in 1873. Its steeply pitched gable roof, board and batten siding, lancet windows and arched side entry way are all typical features of Carpenter Gothic churches.

It was listed on the National Register of Historic Places in 1985.

References

External links
, including photo from 1984, at Maryland Historical Trust

Churches on the National Register of Historic Places in Maryland
Churches completed in 1873
19th-century Episcopal church buildings
Episcopal church buildings in Maryland
Carpenter Gothic church buildings in Maryland
Churches in Baltimore County, Maryland
Woodlawn, Baltimore County, Maryland
National Register of Historic Places in Baltimore County, Maryland